Albert Vanucci (born 8 August 1947) is a French former professional footballer who played as a defender.

External links

External links
 
 
 Profile

1947 births
Living people
Sportspeople from Ajaccio
French footballers
Footballers from Corsica
France international footballers
Association football defenders
AC Ajaccio players
FC Sochaux-Montbéliard players
Olympique de Marseille players
AS Monaco FC players
Racing Besançon players
Ligue 1 players
Ligue 2 players
French football managers